St Albans or Saint Albans (including variations in punctuation) is a placename in several countries, ultimately derived from the name of Saint Alban. St. Albans or Saint Albans can refer to:

Populated places

Australia
St Albans, Victoria, a suburb of Melbourne
Electoral district of St Albans, an electoral district of the Victorian Legislative Assembly. 
St Albans Park, Victoria, a suburb of Geelong
St Albans, New South Wales, a town in New South Wales

Canada
St. Alban's, Newfoundland and Labrador

New Zealand
St Albans, New Zealand, a suburb of Christchurch

United Kingdom
St Albans, the main urban area in the City and District of St Albans
St Albans City and District, an administrative district in Hertfordshire, England
St Albans (UK Parliament constituency)
Duke of St. Albans
St Albans, Nottinghamshire, a civil parish
St Alban's Head, an outcrop of Portland Stone on the coast of Dorset, England

United States
St. Albans, Maine, a town located in Somerset County
St. Albans, Missouri, a town in East Central Missouri
St. Albans, Queens, a residential community in the borough of Queens, New York City
St. Albans (town), Vermont, a town located in Franklin County that surrounds the city of the same name
St. Albans (city), Vermont, a city located in Franklin County
St. Albans Raid, the northernmost engagement of the American Civil War occurred here
St. Albans, West Virginia, a city located in Kanawha County

Other 
St. Alban's Church (disambiguation)
St. Albans School (disambiguation)
St Albans railway station (disambiguation)
SS St. Albans Victory, US cargo ship used as troop transport at end of WWII

See also
Alban (disambiguation)
Saint-Alban (disambiguation)